Telefe (acronym for Televisión Federal) is a television station located in Buenos Aires, Argentina. The station is owned and operated by Paramount Global through Televisión Federal S.A. Telefe is also one of Argentina's six national television networks. Its studios are located on Martínez, Buenos Aires, adjacent to the corporate headquarters; its transmitter is located at the Alas Building.

In areas of Argentina where a Telefe station isn't receivable over-the-air, it is available on satellite and select cable systems. Telefe also has regional stations across the country and an international network (Telefe Internacional) which is available in the Americas, Europe, Asia, and Oceania.

History

First years (1957–73)
The history of Telefe stretches back to 1957, when a group of alumni and lawyers from the Colegio El Salvador led by Fr. Héctor Grandetti, founded the company Difusión Contemporánea S.A. (Contemporary Broadcasting S.A.). This company, known as DiCon for short, submitted a bid in the licensing of two new television channels in Buenos Aires, one on channel 11 and the other on channel 13. On April 28, 1958, DiCon won the license for channel 11.

Original plans to build the new station in the Colegio El Salvador facilities fell through. Eventually, facilities were secured, and Canal 11 finally was able to launch from its first headquarters in San Cristóbal, Buenos Aires. The station finally launched on July 21, 1961 at 8:58 p.m. under Teleonce.

Financial problems forced the station to seek a backer, which would turn out to be ABC from the United States. ABC and DiCon formed Telerama S.R.L., a group that allowed DiCon to upgrade and expand its studio facilities.

During its first decade, Teleonce aired shows like Música en el Aire, Cosa Juzgada, Tato Siempre en Domingo, El Reporter Esso, Radiolandia en TV, Operación Ja Ja and No Toca Botón.

Through the 1960s, the family-oriented programming of the channel could not compete successfully against Canal 9 and did not have great financial backing like Canal 13. On October 17, 1970, businessman Héctor Ricardo García took over the station and changed the profile of the station, for an audience betting on news and more popular programming, adopting the slogan "El canal de las noticias" ("The News Channel"). Under García, Teleonce would climb to the top of the Argentine television ratings.

State-run era (1974–88)
After the licenses expired on October 8, 1973, changes began as the government took control of the news departments of channels 9, 11 and 13. Jorge Conti was named administrator and took over hosting duties for the newscast and other programs. This was followed on September 26, 1974 with the expropriation of the three networks making Conti the administrator again. This continued under the military dictatorship of the National Reorganization Process, with the Argentine Air Force co-administrating the channel with Conti, who remained lead newsreader, and the channel was renamed as Canal Once.

In 1979, with the arrival of colour television looming and facilities upgrades needed to allow colour recording and broadcasting, the state bought the Canal Once plant from García, who had continued to own it, thus becoming a 100 per cent nationally owned network.

The 1980s started with the introduction of colour telecasts on May 6, 1981, but the decade would become turbulent in the legal system. Twice under the dictatorship, a request for bids was issued. On August 19, 1982, the first one received no offers; the second, on October 25, 1983, would result in Canal Once being handed back to García. When Raúl Alfonsín became President of Argentina, among his first acts in office, was to nullify the transfer of Canal Once to García, leaving it in the hands of the state for another six years.

Privatization (1989–98)
As the 1980s began to close, financial problems and hyperinflation had brought Canal Once to its breaking point. The energy crisis that helped bring down Alfonsín's presidency had forced massive cuts in broadcast hours in Buenos Aires; with the ability to broadcast only four, later eight and ultimately ten, hours a day, and amidst the already rough economic backdrop, Canal Once teetered on the brink of bankruptcy. The closure of the station was being batted around at this time. However, salvation came when Carlos Menem announced that he would seek bids to privatize two of the state's three remaining Buenos Aires stations, Canal Once and Canal 13. One of the groups participating in this bidding process was Televisión Federal S.A., a group whose stakeholders were headlined by Editorial Atlántida as a group of privately owned television stations from across the country.

In December 1989, Arte Radiotelevisivo Argentino S.A. (Artear), a subsidiary of Grupo Clarín, won the bidding for Canal Once and Canal 13. Artear chose the latter, and Televisión Federal took control of Canal Once as principal owners effective January 15, 1990. After 16 years of state management, the station was back in the hands of the private sector, and after a decade of branding as Canal Once, the new branding of Telefe, an acronym of the new ownership's name, debuted on March 5 the same year. During the first weeks of the relaunched channel, the Telefe brand mirrored the blue and white of the Flag of Argentina (blue name on a white screen). That logo was later replaced by the three-circles logo used till the present.

Telefónica era (1999–2016)
In 1999, Telefónica acquired ownership of Telefe and its eight owned-and-operated stations; that same year, Telefe launched an international signal aimed at viewers outside of Argentina. It also retained Telefe over Azul Televisión when it bought the latter in 2002. The Federal Broadcasting Committee (COMFER in Spanish) later forced Telefónica to sell off its involvement in Azul Televisión.

With Gustavo Yankelevich (and after 1999, Claudio Villaruel) directing the channel's output, and with the introduction of satellite broadcasts nationwide, Telefe took to an unprecedented 20-year streak atop the Argentina ratings. It logged ratings wins in every year between 1990 and 2009, acquiring the rights to The Simpsons, Formula 1 racing and the franchise for Big Brother.

In 2010 and 2011, under the direction of Marisa Badía, Telefe lost its number one position in the ratings — which had not happened since just after the privatization of the station — to then-perennial runner-up El Trece. In 2012, however, another change in management, this time to Gustavo Yankelevich's son Tomás, and shows like Graduados, Dulce amor and Pekín Express helped Telefe return to the top of the rating list.

Acquisition by Viacom (2016–present)
On November 3, 2016, it was reported that Viacom had won a bid to acquire Telefe. It also made Telefe a sister to Channel 5 in the United Kingdom.

In December 2019, Viacom re-merged with CBS Corporation, forming ViacomCBS (currently known as Paramount Global) and making Telefe a sister to CBS in the United States, and Network 10 in Australia.

Digital channels 
The station's digital signal is multiplexed:

Current programming 

This is a list of programs currently being broadcast by Telefe, with their years of debut in brackets.

Original programming

Comedy
Casados con Hijos (2005; reruns)

Talk shows
A la Barbarossa (2022)
Ariel en su Salsa (2022)
Cortá por Lozano (2017)
La Peña de Morfi (2017)
PH: Podemos Hablar (2017)

Reality/non-scripted
Gran Hermano (2001)
Juego Chino (2022)
Pasapalabra (2021)
El Último Pasajero (2022)

News programming
Buen Telefe (2017)
El Noticiero de la Gente (2017)
Staff (2017)
Telefe Noticias (1990)
#TT: Tiempo y Tránsito (2019)

Acquired programming

Drama
Bir Zamanlar Çukurova (as Züleyha) (2021)
Bizim Hikaye (as Amor de Familia) (2022)
Génesis (2022)

Comedy
The Simpsons (1991)

Children programming
All of the acquired children programming has been included under the  Finde en Nick programming block since 2017.
Alvin and the Chipmunks (2017)
Blaze and the Monster Machines (2020)
Dora and Friends: Into the City! (2017)
The Loud House (2020)
PAW Patrol (2017)
Shimmer and Shine (2017)
SpongeBob SquarePants (2020)

Affiliates 
The network currently has eight owned-and-operated stations and current affiliation agreements with other television stations.

Owned and operated
All of the owned-and-operated stations (except LRK458 TV) joined Telefe in April 1998, after Editorial Atlántida acquired a majority stake of the former Televisoras Provinciales. LRK458 TV (now known as Telefe Tucumán) was the last to join Telefe in March 2000.

Affiliates

References

External links
 
Telefe International 

 
Paramount International Networks
Television networks in Argentina
Television channels and stations established in 1961
Television stations in Argentina
Broadcasting in Argentina
Spanish-language television stations
Mass media in Buenos Aires
1961 establishments in Argentina
2016 mergers and acquisitions